St. Stephen High School is a grade 9-12 school located in St. Stephen, New Brunswick.

See also
 List of schools in New Brunswick
 Anglophone South School District

References

Schools in Charlotte County, New Brunswick
St. Stephen, New Brunswick
High schools in New Brunswick